is a former Japanese football player.

Career 
In 2003 won with the JEF United Chiba the J.League Youth Championship.

2006 started his professional career with Vegalta Sendai in the defensive and offensive midfield role. In the spring 2009 joined as right back to FC Ryukyu. After two years left Ryukyu and signed for Zweigen Kanazawa.

Club statistics

References

1987 births
Living people
Association football people from Chiba Prefecture
Japanese footballers
J2 League players
Japan Football League players
Vegalta Sendai players
FC Ryukyu players
Zweigen Kanazawa players
Association football midfielders